William Edward Heaton VC (2 January 1875 – 5 June 1941) was an English recipient of the Victoria Cross, the highest and most prestigious award for gallantry in the face of the enemy that can be awarded to British and Commonwealth forces.

Details
Heaton was 25 years old, and a private in the 1st Battalion, The King's (Liverpool) Regiment, British Army during the Second Boer War when the following deed took place at Geluk, South Africa for which he was awarded the VC:

Further information
He later achieved the rank of sergeant and served during World War I.

The medal
His Victoria Cross is displayed at the Museum of the King's Regiment, Liverpool, England.

References

Monuments to Courage (David Harvey, 1999)
The Register of the Victoria Cross (This England, 1997)
Victoria Crosses of the Anglo-Boer War (Ian Uys, 2000)

External links
Location of grave and VC medal (Lancashire)
The King's Regiment (regiment history)

1875 births
1941 deaths
People from Ormskirk
Second Boer War recipients of the Victoria Cross
British recipients of the Victoria Cross
King's Regiment (Liverpool) soldiers
British Army personnel of the Second Boer War
British Army personnel of World War I
British Army recipients of the Victoria Cross
Military personnel from Lancashire